DeCanio is a surname. Notable people with the surname include:

Matt DeCanio (born 1977), American cyclist
Stephen DeCanio (born 1942), American academic

See also
 Canio